The 1953 National Football League Draft was held on January 22, 1953, at Bellevue-Stratford Hotel in Philadelphia. Selections made by the folded Dallas Texans were assigned to the Baltimore Colts, since the Dallas team had moved to Baltimore.

This was the seventh year that the first overall pick was a bonus pick determined by lottery, with the previous six winners (Chicago Bears in 1947, Washington Redskins in 1948, Philadelphia Eagles in 1949, Detroit Lions in 1950, New York Giants in 1951, and Los Angeles Rams in 1952) ineligible from the draw; it was won by the San Francisco 49ers, who selected end Harry Babcock.

Player selections

Round one

 HOF Member of the Professional Football Hall of Fame

Round two

Round three

Round four

Round five

Round six

Round seven

Round eight

Round nine

Round ten

Round eleven

Round twelve

Round thirteen

Round fourteen

Round fifteen

Round sixteen

Round seventeen

Round eighteen

Round nineteen

Round twenty

Round twenty-one

Round twenty-two

Round twenty-three

Round twenty-four

Round twenty-five

Round twenty-six

Round twenty-seven

Round twenty-eight

Round twenty-nine

Round thirty

Hall of Famers
 Joe Schmidt, linebacker from the University of Pittsburgh taken 7th round 85th overall by the Detroit Lions.
Inducted: Professional Football Hall of Fame class of 1973.
 Roosevelt Brown, offensive tackle from Morgan State University taken 27th round 321st overall by the New York Giants.
Inducted: Professional Football Hall of Fame class of 1975.
 Jim Ringo, center from Syracuse University taken 7th round 79th overall by the Green Bay Packers.
Inducted: Professional Football Hall of Fame class of 1981.
 Doug Atkins, tackle from Tennessee taken 1st round 11th overall by the Cleveland Browns.
Inducted: Professional Football Hall of Fame class of 1982.
 John Henry Johnson, fullback from Arizona State University taken 2nd round 18th overall by the Pittsburgh Steelers.
Inducted: Professional Football Hall of Fame class of 1987.
 Bob St. Clair, offensive tackle from the University of San Francisco taken 3rd round 32nd overall by the San Francisco 49ers.
Inducted: Professional Football Hall of Fame class of 1990.
 Stan Jones, guard and defensive tackle from Maryland taken 5th round 54th overall by the Chicago Bears.
Inducted: Professional Football Hall of Fame class of 1991.
 Chuck Noll, guard from the University of Dayton taken 20th round 239th overall by the Cleveland Browns.
Inducted: Professional Football Hall of Fame class of 1993 as a coach.

Notable undrafted players

References

External links
 NFL.com – 1953 Draft
 databaseFootball.com – 1953 Draft
 Pro Football Hall of Fame

National Football League Draft
Draft
NFL Draft
NFL Draft
1950s in Philadelphia
American football in Philadelphia
Events in Philadelphia